The Toronto Jr. Canadiens are a Junior "A" ice hockey team based in the Downsview neighbourhood of Toronto, Ontario, Canada.  They were known as the Wexford Raiders until the end of the 2005–06 season and are a part of Ontario Junior Hockey League (OJHL) but used to be a part of the Metro Junior A Hockey League.

History
The team originated in 1972 as the Wexford Warriors of the Metro Junior B league, when the original Wexford Raiders jumped to the Junior A Ontario Provincial League in 1972.  When the Junior A Raiders folded in 1981, the Junior B Warriors adopted the Raider name and kept it until 2006.

The Wexford Raiders were one of the strongest teams to play in the Metro Junior A Hockey League.  A losing team for much of its history, they become one of the most dominant squads in 1990, under coaches Stan Butler and Kevin Burkett.  Butler and Burkett coached the Wexford Raiders midget team to the 1989 championship, then took most of the players to the Junior B level in 1990, and they served as the foundation to four consecutive Metro championship squads.  During the 1990s, under the management of Burkett and Butler, the Raiders sent more players on NCAA Division I hockey scholarships than any other junior team in North America.  In 1994, the Raiders defeated the Caledon Canadians 4-games-to-0 in the Metro League final.  The Canadians were granted the permission to host the Dudley Hewitt Cup that year and ended up winning it despite losing the Metro final.

In 1998, again playing Caledon, the Raiders won the last Metro Junior "A" title in game 7 by a score of 9–0. In 2006, the Raiders changed their name to the Toronto Jr. Canadiens and took on the colors of the Montreal Canadiens.

2006-07 

On February 11, 2007, after 144 minutes and 32 seconds of play, the Canadiens defeated the Pickering Panthers in Game 2 of the first round of the playoffs. The game-winning goal was credited to Kyle Wetering at the 4:32 mark of the 5th overtime. Toronto outshot Pickering 88–86. On February 12, 2007, TSN show That's Hockey showed highlights of the game and announced that the history of the game may be preserved in the Hockey Hall of Fame as the longest junior hockey game in history, far surpassing the previous record. The game has been officially named the longest game in Ontario Hockey Association history.

Season-by-season results

Playoffs
MetJHL Years
1990 Lost Final
Wexford Raiders defeated Oshawa Legionaires 4-games-to-3
Wexford Raiders defeated Kingston Voyageurs 4-games-to-none
Thornhill Thunderbirds defeated Wexford Raiders 4-games-to-3
1991 Won League
Wexford Raiders defeated Kingston Voyageurs 4-games-to-1
Wexford Raiders defeated Oshawa Legionaires 4-games-to-3
Wexford Raiders defeated Bramalea Blues 4-games-to-3 METJHL CHAMPIONS
1992 Won League
Wexford Raiders defeated Kingston Voyageurs 4-games-to-1
Wexford Raiders defeated Thornhill Thunderbirds 4-games-to-2
Wexford Raiders defeated Bramalea Blues 4-games-to-none METJHL CHAMPIONS
1993 Won League
Wexford Raiders defeated Richmond Hill Riot 4-games-to-none
Wexford Raiders defeated Wellington Dukes 4-games-to-none
Wexford Raiders defeated St. Michael's Buzzers 4-games-to-1 METJHL CHAMPIONS
1994 Won League, Lost OHA Buckland Cup round robin
Wexford Raiders defeated Kingston Voyageurs 4-games-to-1
Wexford Raiders defeated Thornhill Islanders 4-games-to-none
Wexford Raiders defeated Caledon Canadians 4-games-to-none METJHL CHAMPIONS
Third and eliminated in OHA Buckland Cup round robin (1-2)
1995 Lost Final
Wexford Raiders defeated Wellington Dukes 4-games-to-2
Wexford Raiders defeated Thornhill Islanders 4-games-to-3
Caledon Canadians defeated Wexford Raiders 4-games-to-none
1996 Lost Semi-final
Wexford Raiders defeated Wellington Dukes 4-games-to-1
Thornhill Islanders defeated Wexford Raiders 4-games-to-2
1997 Lost Semi-final
Wexford Raiders defeated Niagara Scenic 4-games-to-none
First in round robin quarter-final (4-2)
Caledon Canadians defeated Wexford Raiders 4-games-to-none
1998 Won League, Lost OHA Buckland Cup
Wexford Raiders defeated Quinte Hawks 3-games-to-none
Wexford Raiders defeated Oshawa Legionaires 4-games-to-2
Wexford Raiders defeated Caledon Canadians 4-games-to-3 METJHL CHAMPIONS
Milton Merchants (OPJHL) defeated Wexford Raiders 4-games-to-1
OJHL Years

Raiders 1970-1981

There also was a Wexford Raiders team in the Ontario Provincial Junior League based in the Wexford neighbourhood of the Toronto suburb of Scarborough. The team originated in 1970 as the Toronto Raiders of the Metro Junior B league, and was renamed the Wexford Raiders in 1971. In 1972, the team moved to the new Ontario Provincial Junior League in 1972 and operated until 1981. After the Junior A team folded, the Metro B "Warriors" assumed the "Raider" name in 1983.

Season-by-season results

Playoffs
1973 Won League, Lost OHA Buckland Cup
Wexford Raiders defeated Weston Dodgers 4-games-to-1
Wexford Raiders defeated Dixie Beehives 4-games-to-2
Wexford Raiders defeated Toronto Nationals 4-games-to-1 OPJHL CHAMPIONS
Chatham Maroons (SOJHL) defeated Wexford Raiders 4-games-to-3
1974 Won League, Won OHA Buckland Cup, Lost Hewitt-Dudley Memorial Trophy semi-final
Wexford Raiders defeated Richmond Hill Rams 4-games-to-2
Wexford Raiders defeated North Bay Trappers 4-games-to-3
Wexford Raiders defeated Aurora Tigers 4-games-to-1 OPJHL CHAMPIONS
Wexford Raiders defeated Windsor Spitfires (SOJHL) 4-games-to-3 BUCKLAND CUP CHAMPIONS
Thunder Bay Hurricanes (TBJHL) defeated Wexford Raiders 4-games-to-3
1975 Lost Final
Wexford Raiders defeated Aurora Tigers 4-games-to-none
Wexford Raiders defeated North York Rangers 4-games-to-3
Toronto Nationals defeated Wexford Raiders 4-games-to-1
1976 Lost Quarter-final
North Bay Trappers defeated Wexford Raiders 4-games-to-2
1977 Lost Quarter-final
Royal York Royals defeated Wexford Raiders 4-games-to-2
1978 Lost Quarter-final
Guelph Platers defeated Wexford Raiders 4-games-to-none
1979 DNQ
1980  Lost Quarter-final
Dixie Beehives defeated Wexford Raiders 4-games-to-none
1981 DNQ

Notable alumni
Keith Acton
Bill Armstrong
Mark Botell
Brian Boucher
Brian Bradley
Stan Butler
Anson Carter
Andy Chiodo
Devante Smith-Pelly
Doug Doull
 Brett McConnachie 
Dave Duerden
Iain Duncan
Oren Eizenman (born 1985), Israeli-Canadian ice hockey player
Larry Floyd
Matt Foy
 Luciano Aquino
Scott Fraser
 Orin Ezienman
Steve Guolla  
Mark Kirton
Chris Kotsopoulos
Paul Lawless
Steve Maltais
John McFarland
Lindsay Middlebrook
Gavin Morgan
Bryan Muir
Mark Napier
Ryan O'Reilly
Steve Rooney
Al Secord
Luke Sellars
George Servinis
Derrick Smith
Greg Smyth
Brad Tapper
Bill Terry
Greg Theberge
Jeff Ware
Daniel Winnik
Mike Zigomanis

References

External links
Toronto Jr. Canadiens

Ontario Provincial Junior A Hockey League teams
Ca
Ice hockey clubs established in 1972
1972 establishments in Ontario